The Glenwood Houses is a  moderate to low income public housing development operated by the New York City Housing Authority (NYCHA) in the Flatlands section of the New York City borough of Brooklyn. The development is bordered by Ralph Avenue on the east, East 56th Street on the west, Glenwood Road/Avenue H on the south, and Farragut Road on the north side.

About 
The Glenwood Houses were built during the post-World War II era when NYCHA reached its peak in construction of public housing projects (1945–65). The project was built in a modified tower-in-the-park style development, popular among NYCHA projects at that time.

The development was designed by architect Adolph Goldberg and construction began in 1949, and opened on July 14, 1950.

Notable residents

Neil Bogart (1943–1982), Casablanca Records owner and director
Dagmara Domińczyk (born 1976), actress
Marika Domińczyk (born 1980), actress
Ill Bill (born 1972), rapper
Necro (born 1976), rapper

See also
New York City Housing Authority
List of New York City Housing Authority properties

References 

Residential buildings completed in 1950
Residential buildings in Brooklyn
Public housing in Brooklyn